The following is the qualification system and qualified countries for the Rowing at the 2019 Pan American Games competition.

Qualification system
A total of 220 rowers will qualify to compete at the games. A country may only enter a maximum of 26 rowers. All qualification will be done at the 2018 Qualifier Championship (except the men's eights which will be by entry only), where a specific number of boats will qualify in each of the fourteen events.

Qualification timeline

Qualification summary

Men's events

Single sculls

Double sculls

Quadruple sculls

Pairs

Fours

Eights

Lightweight double sculls

Lightweight fours

Women's events

Single sculls

Double sculls

Quadruple sculls

Pairs

Lightweight single sculls

Lightweight double sculls

References

P
Qualification for the 2019 Pan American Games
Rowing at the 2019 Pan American Games